Fairfields is a district and civil parish that covers a large new development area on the western flank of Milton Keynes, Buckinghamshire, England. As the first tier of Local Government, the parish council is responsible for the people who live and work in this area of Milton Keynes.

It is bounded by Calverton Lane (the Monks Way (H3) alignment west of Watling Street), Watling Street (V4), the Ridgeway (H1) reserve route, and a hedgerow line with Calverton CP.

Origins
The (greenfield) land it occupies was previously part of Fairfields Farm, in Calverton, a rural parish that is now just outside the Milton Keynes urban area. In 2004, the Government decided on the further expansion of Milton Keynes and accordingly designated land on the eastern and western flanks for this purpose. Along with the adjacent parish of Whitehouse (and Broughton on the eastern flank), this is the part of the implementation of that decision.

Notes

References

Civil parishes in Buckinghamshire